Janno is both a masculine given name and a surname predominantly found in Estonia. As a given name it can be a diminutive of Johannes, Juhan, Jan, Jaan, and Jaanus.
People bearing the name Janno include:
Janno Gibbs (born 1969), Filipino singer-songwriter, actor, and comedian
Janno Jürgens (born 1985), Estonian film director
Janno Jürisson (born 1980), Estonian footballer 
Janno Kivisild (born 1977), Estonian football coach
Janno Põldma (born 1950), Estonian film director and children's writer
Janno Prants (born 1973), Estonian biathlete
Janno Reiljan (1951–2018), Estonian politician, economist and professor of foreign economics

References

Masculine given names
Estonian masculine given names
Estonian-language surnames